Filipe Vilaça Oliveira (born 27 May 1984) is a Portuguese former professional footballer who played mainly as a right midfielder but also as an attacking right back.

After starting out at Chelsea as a senior, he went on to play mostly for Videoton in Hungary. In his country's Primeira Liga, he amassed totals of 92 matches and one goal over five seasons.

Club career
Born in Braga, Oliveira started his career with local S.C. Braga, joining their youth system at the age of 10. Still in his teens he was bought by Chelsea for a reported cost of £500,000, making his Premier League debut on 19 October 2002 in a 3–0 away win over Manchester City where he played one minute after coming on as a substitute for two-time scorer Gianfranco Zola; however, he never managed to break into the main squad and, during one month, served a spell at Preston North End.

Oliveira played once for the Blues in 2004–05, in the last game against Newcastle United where he also came off the bench. In the summer of 2005 he was loaned to C.S. Marítimo, with Nuno Morais joining in the same situation; after the season finished, he agreed to be released from his contract and signed with the Madeira-based club.

At the end of 2006–07, which included his first Primeira Liga goal in a 2–3 away loss against neighbours C.D. Nacional, Oliveira was released and joined Leixões SC, which had just returned to the top flight after several decades of absence. In June 2008, after having helped the Matosinhos team retain their league status, he returned to Braga now as a senior player, signing a two-year contract. He appeared very rarely throughout his debut campaign, one of his few chances being a 5–0 win at C.F. Os Belenenses.

After the January 2010 sale of starter João Pereira to Sporting Clube de Portugal, Oliveira became the first-choice right back. He finished the season with 17 appearances, as the Minho side achieved a best-ever second place in the league.

In July 2010, Oliveira joined Parma FC – who paid K.A.S. Eupen a fee of €1 million (5% Solidarity Contribution included) – being called up to training camp on the 12th. Two weeks later he was loaned to fellow Italians Torino F.C. for €600,000, with the Serie B club having an option to buy half of his contract subsequently; he was recalled from his spell in the following transfer window, only managing one official appearance during his first year (25 minutes in a 1–1 away draw to Cagliari Calcio, in Serie A's last round).

In early August 2011, Oliveira was sent on loan to Videoton FC in Hungary, and the move was made permanent at the end of the campaign. On 29 May 2015, after contributing with 26 games, six goals and 11 assists as the team won the second Nemzeti Bajnokság I championship in their history, the 31-year-old renewed his contract for a further two seasons.

Oliveira switched countries again on 31 January 2017, joining Cypriot First Division's Anorthosis Famagusta FC until the end of the season. Nearly a year later, having been unemployed for half of that time, he signed for Sepsi OSK Sfântu Gheorghe who were aiming to stay in Romania's Liga I.

International career
Oliveira represented Portugal at every youth level. He was part of the team that finished runners-up to Italy in the 2003 UEFA European Under-19 Championship.

In summer 2006, Oliveira appeared – with Chelsea and Marítimo teammate Morais – for the under-21s at the 2006 European Under-21 Championship, on home soil.

Club statistics

Honours
Videoton
Nemzeti Bajnokság I: 2014–15
Ligakupa: 2011–12

References

External links

National team data 

1984 births
Living people
Sportspeople from Braga
Portuguese footballers
Association football defenders
Association football midfielders
Premier League players
English Football League players
Chelsea F.C. players
Preston North End F.C. players
Primeira Liga players
Segunda Divisão players
C.S. Marítimo players
Leixões S.C. players
S.C. Braga players
Serie A players
Serie B players
Parma Calcio 1913 players
Torino F.C. players
Nemzeti Bajnokság I players
Fehérvár FC players
Cypriot First Division players
Anorthosis Famagusta F.C. players
Liga I players
Sepsi OSK Sfântu Gheorghe players
Portugal youth international footballers
Portugal under-21 international footballers
Portugal B international footballers
Portuguese expatriate footballers
Expatriate footballers in England
Expatriate footballers in Italy
Expatriate footballers in Hungary
Expatriate footballers in Cyprus
Expatriate footballers in Romania
Portuguese expatriate sportspeople in England
Portuguese expatriate sportspeople in Italy
Portuguese expatriate sportspeople in Hungary
Portuguese expatriate sportspeople in Cyprus
Portuguese expatriate sportspeople in Romania